The 40th Canadian Parliament contained a record number of female Members of Parliament, with 69 women elected to the House of Commons of Canada in the 2008 federal election. However, this represented just 22 per cent of the 308 total MPs, and only a modest gain over the 65 women in the 39th Canadian Parliament.

With 23 women elected to the House for the first time, the 2008 election also increased the number of female MPs who have sat in the House of Commons of Canada since Confederation to 216, from 193 at the end of the 39th Parliament. Nine incumbent women MPs did not stand for re-election in 2008, and ten incumbent women were defeated on election night.

In total, 445 women ran in the 2008 election. The record for female participation in a federal election continues to be held by the 1993 election, in which 476 women ran as candidates, but the 2008 election had the second largest slate of female candidates in Canadian history.

By contrast, the United States House of Representatives has elected only a marginally larger number of women despite having 127 more seats. The 2008 Congressional elections saw 74 women elected to the House of Representatives, for an all-time total of 229.

At the dissolution of the 40th Parliament, the number of women sitting as federal MPs stood at 67, as two women elected in 2008 subsequently resigned from the House: Dawn Black on April 13, 2009 and Judy Wasylycia-Leis on April 30, 2010. Women did not win any of the by-elections to the 40th Canadian Parliament.

Party standings

The 2008 election was the first time in Canadian electoral history that one of the major parties nominated more female candidates than the New Democrats or their predecessor, the Co-operative Commonwealth Federation.

By province

Members
The longest-serving female MP currently in the House of Commons is Albina Guarnieri, who was first elected in the 1988 election and surpassed 20 years in office in December 2008. In the 39th Parliament, Guarnieri was tied for this status with Diane Marleau, who was first elected in 1988 but was defeated in the 2008 election.

† denotes women who were newly elected in the 2008 election and are serving their first term in office. Names in boldface denote ministers in the current Cabinet of Canada.

References

40th Canadian Parliament
Parliament, 40